Lisa Tessman is a professor of philosophy at Binghamton University. She is also a faculty member in the women, gender, and sexuality studies. She currently teaches graduate programs in social, political, ethical and legal philosophy or SPEL. She also teaches undergraduate programs in philosophy, and philosophy, politics and law or PPL. She received her PhD in philosophy from the University of Massachusetts, Amherst, in 1996.

Work

Tessman's research is focused on ethics with a feminist approach. Within her work, she considers the social and political conditions in which moral experiences take place. Her first monograph titled Burdened Virtues: Virtue Ethics for Liberatory Struggles was published by the Oxford University Press. This specific work focuses on virtues that carry a cost to those who practice them under oppression. Apart from this, she also published multiple articles and has edited a collection titled Feminist Ethics and Social and Political Philosophy: Theorizing the Non-Ideal, as well as co-edited a volume called Jewish Locations: Traversing Racialized Landscapes

Tessman's second monograph titled Moral Failure: On the Impossible Demands of Morality focuses on exposing the difficulties of moral life and how inevitable some moral failures may be. This book goes into different literatures from scholarship on Holocaust testimony to ideal and nonideal theory. This work also includes feminist care ethics, as well as debates about moral demandingness. In her work, Tessman tries to make sense of how moral requirements that are contradicting can carry moral authority.

Tessman is a founding member of the Association for Feminist Ethics and Social Theory also known as FEAST. She also served on its steering committee from 1999 to 2011 as chair of the steering committee, chair of the program committee, and chair of the Diversity Committee. She has also been on the Board of Associate Editors for Hypatia: A Journal of Feminist Philosophy since 2009. Tessman also served on the APA Committee on Inclusiveness in the Profession and on the Distinguished Woman Philosopher Award Selection Committee for the Society for Women in Philosophy (SWIP).

References

Binghamton University faculty
American women philosophers
Living people
Year of birth missing (living people)
University of Massachusetts Amherst College of Humanities and Fine Arts alumni
21st-century American women